Thermistis nigromacula is a species of beetle in the family Cerambycidae. It was described by Hua in 1992. It is known from Vietnam and China.

References

Saperdini
Beetles described in 1992